Without You may refer to:

Music

Albums 
 Without You (Karen Mok album), 2006
 Without You (Sami Yusuf album), 2009
 Without You (EP), by Lauv, 2020

Songs

Before 1980 
 "Without You", from the musical My Fair Lady, 1956
 "Without You", by Cliff Richard from 21 Today, 1961
 ""Without You" (Johnny Tillotson song), 1961
 "Without You", by Manfred Mann from Manfred Mann's Cock-a-Hoop, 1964
 "Without You", by Crispian St. Peters from Follow Me..., 1966
 "Without You", by Fleetwood Mac, written by Danny Kirwan, from Then Play On, 1969
 "Without You", by Paul Revere & the Raiders, B-side to the single "Mr. Sun, Mr. Moon", 1969
 "Without You" (Badfinger song), 1970, covered by Harry Nilsson, Shirley Bassey, Air Supply, T. G. Sheppard, Mariah Carey, and other artists
 "Without You", by the Doobie Brothers from The Captain and Me, 1973
 "Without You", by Janis Ian from Stars, 1974
 "Without You (There Ain't No Love at All)", by Yvonne Elliman from Love Me, 1977
 "Without You", by Lynsey De Paul from Tigers and Fireflies, 1979

1980s 
 "Without You", by the Marshall Tucker Band from Tenth, 1980
 "Without You", by Asia from Asia, 1982
 "Without You", by Eurogliders from Pink Suit Blue Day, 1982
 "Without You (Not Another Lonely Night)", by Franke and the Knockouts, 1982
 "Without You" (David Bowie song), 1983
 "Without You", by Chaz Jankel from Chazablanca, 1983
 "Without You", by Gordon Lightfoot from Salute, 1983
 "Without You" (Peabo Bryson and Regina Belle song), 1987
 "Without You" (George Lamond song), 1989
 "Without You" (Mötley Crüe song), 1989

1990s 
 "Without You" (Debbie Gibson song), 1990
 "Without You", by Giant from Time to Burn, 1992
 "Without You" (Girlfriend song), 1992
 "Without You", by All-4-One from All-4-One, 1994
 "Without You", by Bruce Springsteen from Blood Brothers, 1996
 "Without You", from the musical Rent, 1996
 "Without You", by Bic Runga from Drive, 1997
 "Without You", by Samantha Cole, 1997
 "Without You" (Sqeezer song), 1998
 "Without You" (Van Halen song), 1998
 "Without You", by Corey Hart from Jade, 1998
 "Without You", by Nicole Wray from the Why Do Fools Fall in Love film soundtrack, 1998
 "Without You" (Dixie Chicks song), 1999
 "Without You", by Angie Stone from Black Diamond, 1999
 "Without You", by Lenny Kravitz from 5, 1999 reissue

2000s 
 "Without You" (Charlie Wilson song), 2000
 "Without You", by Vision of Disorder from From Bliss to Devastation, 2001
 "Without You" (Silverchair song), 2002
 "Without You", by Blue, written by Lee Ryan, Mark Hall, and Conner Reeves, from One Love, 2002
 "Without You", by Busted from Busted, 2002
 "Without You", by Donna de Lory from Songs 95, 2002
 "Without You", by Laura Pausini from From the Inside, 2002
 "Without You", by Default from Elocation, 2003
 "Without You", by Re-union, representing Netherlands in the Eurovision Song Contest 2004
 "Without You" (Brooke Fraser song), 2005
 "Without You" (El Presidente song), 2005
 "Without You", by Dogzilla, 2005
 "Without You", by Third Day from Wherever You Are, 2005
 "Without You", by Yoshiki from Eternal Melody II, 2005
 "Without You", by Ayọ from Joyful, 2006
 "Without You", by Christina Aguilera from Back to Basics, 2006
 "Without You", by Mad Caddies from Keep It Going, 2007
 "Without You", by Social Code from Social-Code, 2007
 "Without You" (The Feeling song), 2008
 "Without You" (Hinder song), 2008
 "Without You", by Kevin Rudolf from In the City, 2008
 "Without You", by Mark Gormley, 2008
 "Without You" (Empire of the Sun song), 2009
 "Without You", by Breaking Benjamin from Dear Agony, 2009
 "Without You", by Erika Jayne from Pretty Mess, 2009
 "Without You", by Pixie Lott from Turn It Up, 2009
 "Without You", by Three Days Grace from Life Starts Now, 2009

2010s 
 "Without You" (Jyongri song), 2010
 "Without You" (Keith Urban song), 2010
 "Without You", by Falco from Falco 3, 2010 reissue
 "Without You", by Keke Wyatt from Who Knew?, 2010
 "Without You", by My Darkest Days from My Darkest Days, 2010
 "Without You", by We Are the Fallen from Tear the World Down, 2010
 "Without You" (David Guetta song), 2011
 "Without You", by Eddie Vedder from Ukulele Songs, 2011
 "Without You", by Ashes Remain from What I've Become, 2011
 "Without You" (Monica song), 2012
 "Without You", by Brandy Norwood from Two Eleven, 2012
 "Without You", by Lana Del Rey from Born to Die, 2012
 "Without You", by Y'akoto, co-written by Tom Hugo, 2012
 "Without You" (Blue song), written by Wayne Hector, Mich Hansen, Jason Gill, Daniel Davidsen, Lee Ryan, Duncan James, Antony Costa, and Simon Webbe, 2013
 "Without You", by Dillon Francis and Totally Enormous Extinct Dinosaurs, 2013 
 "Without You", by Fleetwood Mac, written by Stevie Nicks, from Extended Play, 2013
 "Without You", by Jeremy Camp from Reckless, 2013
 "Without You" (Junior Sanchez song), 2014
 "Without You", by For King & Country from Run Wild. Live Free. Love Strong., 2014
 "Without You", by Lil Wayne featuring Bibi Bourelly from Free Weezy Album, 2015
 "Without You", by Oh Wonder from Oh Wonder, 2015
 "Without You", by Anderson Paak from Malibu, 2016
 "Without You", by Marcus & Martinus from Together, 2016
 "Without You", by the Rua, 2016
 "Without You", by Andra featuring David Bisbal, 2016
 "Without You" (NCT U song), 2016
 "Without You" (Avicii song), 2017
 "Without You", by Rachel Platten from Waves, 2017
 "Without You", by Shouse, 2017
 ”Without You”, by Slander & Kayzo from Dilapidation Celebration, 2017
 "Without You", by X Japan from We Are X, 2017
 "Without You", by Alexandra Burke from The Truth Is, 2018
 "Without You", by Cashmere Cat from Princess Catgirl, 2019
 "Without You" (John Newman and Nina Nesbitt song), 2019
 "Without You", by Westlife from Spectrum, 2019

2020s 
 "Without You" (The Kid Laroi song), 2020
 "Without You" (Luke Combs song), 2020
 "WITHOUT YOU" by Quavo, 2023

Other uses 
 Without You (book), a 2006 memoir by Anthony Rapp
 Without You (film), a 1934 British comedy film
 Without You, a 2008 film by Tal Rosner
 Without You (TV series), a 2011 UK drama starring Anna Friel

See also
 "Ohne dich" (German for "Without You"), a 2004 song by Rammstein
 "Wid Out Ya", a 2006 song by Blog 27
 Me Without You (disambiguation)
 With or Without You (disambiguation)
 With You (disambiguation)
 Without Me (disambiguation)
 Without U (disambiguation)
 Without You I'm Nothing (disambiguation)
 Without Your Love (disambiguation)